The Pilditch Baronetcy, of Bartropps in the County of Surrey, is a title in the Baronetage of the United Kingdom. It was created on 28 June 1929 for Philip Pilditch. He represented Spelthorne in the House of Commons as a Unionist. As of 2014 the title is held by his great-grandson, the fifth Baronet, who succeeded his father in 2012.

Pilditch baronets, of Bartropps (1929)
Sir Philip Edward Pilditch, 1st Baronet (1861–1948)
Sir Philip Harold Pilditch, 2nd Baronet (1890–1949)
Sir Philip John Frederick Pilditch, 3rd Baronet (1919–1954)
Sir Richard Edward Pilditch, 4th Baronet (1926–2012)
Sir John Richard Pilditch, 5th Baronet (born 1955)

There is no heir.

Notes

References
Kidd, Charles, Williamson, David (editors). Debrett's Peerage and Baronetage (1990 edition). New York: St Martin's Press, 1990, Page B 690

External links
Picture of Sir Philip and Lady Pilditch at Bartropps

Pilditch